is a Japanese anime screenwriter and light novelist. His grandfather is essayist and literary critic Kiyoteru Hanada, who also gave him his first name.

Screenwriting
 series head writer denoted in bold

Television series
Jankenman (1992)
Yoyo no Neko Tsumami (1992)
 Tanoshii Willow Town (1994)
 Slayers (1995)
 Slayers Next (1996)
Chobits (2002)
 Magical Shopping Arcade Abenobashi (2002)
Mahoromatic: Something More Beautiful (2002)
Petite Princess Yucie (2002-2003)
 The Mythical Detective Loki Ragnarok (2003)
Popotan (2003)
Hanaukyo Maid Team: La Verite (2004)
Rozen Maiden (2004)
 Burn-Up Scramble (2004)
 Diamond Daydreams (2004)
 Kannazuki no Miko (2004)
 Gakuen Alice (2004-2005)
 Ah! My Goddess (2005)
 He Is My Master (2005)
  (2005)
 Elemental Gelade (2005)
 Strawberry Marshmallow (2005)
 Happy Seven (2005)
Rozen Maiden Träumend (2005-2006)
 Fate/stay night (2006)
 Sasami: Magical Girls Club (2006)
 Ah! My Goddess: Flights of Fancy (2006)
Kashimashi: Girl Meets Girl (2006)
Rozen Maiden Ouvertüre (2006)
 Code-E (2007)
Idolmaster: Xenoglossia (2007)
Sola (2007)
 Mission-E (2008)
 Kyōran Kazoku Nikki (2008)
H2O: Footprints in the Sand (2008)
S.A (2008)
Yozakura Quartet (2008)
 Chrome Shelled Regios (2009)
 K-On! (2009)
 Beyblade: Metal Fusion (2009)
The Girl Who Leapt Through Space (2009)
Student Council%27s Discretion (2009)
 Shugo Chara!! Doki (2009)
 Tatakau Shisho: The Book of Bantorra (2009)
 Hanasakeru Seishōnen (2009-2010)
 K-On!! (2010)
Princess Jellyfish (2010)
Level E (2010)
Nichijou (2011)
 Kimi to Boku (2011)
Steins;Gate (2011)
 Natsume%27s Book of Friends (2011-2012)
 Kimi to Boku 2 (2012)
 Accel World (2012)
Campione! (2012)
 Love, Chunibyo & Other Delusions Lite (2012)
Love, Chunibyo %26 Other Delusions (2012)
 The Pet Girl of Sakurasou (2012-2013)
Robotics;Notes (2012-2013)
 Tamako Market (2013)
 A Certain Scientific Railgun S (2013)
 Strike the Blood (2013)
 Magi: The Kingdom of Magic (2013)
Beyond the Boundary (2013)
Love Live! School Idol Project (2013-2014)
 Beyond the Boundary: Idol Trial! (2013-2014)
 Love, Chunibyo & Other Delusions: -Heart Throb- Lite (2013-2014)
 Love, Chunibyo & Other Delusions -Heart Throb- (2014)
No Game No Life (2014)
 The Seven Deadly Sins (2014-2015)
Kantai Collection (2015)
Sound! Euphonium (2015)
Wakaba Girl (2015)
Sound! Euphonium 2 (2016)
Love Live! Sunshine!! (2016-2017)
 Comic Girls (2018)
 A Place Further than the Universe (2018)
Bloom Into You (2018)
Steins;Gate 0 (2018)
Hitori Bocchi no Marumaru Seikatsu (2019)
Granbelm (2019)
Love Live! Superstar!! (2021-2022)
The Dangers in My Heart (2023)
Atri: My Dear Moments (TBA)

OVAs
 Sola: A Different Route (2007)
 Sola: Towards the Dawning Sky (2007)
 Aki Sora (2009)
 Aki Sora: Yume no Naka (2010)
 Nichijou Episode 0 (2011)
 Steins;Gate: Egoistic Poriomania (2012)
 Love, Chunibyo & Other Delusions: Glimmering...Explosive Festival (Slapstick Noel) (2013)
 Love, Chunibyo & Other Delusions -Heart Throb-: Playback of...the Wicked Eye’s Apocalypse (The Rikka Wars) (2014)
 Beyond the Boundary: Daybreak (2014)
 Sound! Euphonium: Dash, Monaka (2015)
 Steins;Gate 0 - Valentine’s of Crystal Polymorphism: Bittersweet Intermedio (2018)

Anime films
 Steins;Gate: The Movie − Load Region of Déjà Vu (2013)
 Love, Chunibyo & Other Delusions: Rikka Version (2013)
 Love Live! The School Idol Movie (2015)
 Beyond the Boundary: -I’ll Be Here- Past (2015)
 Beyond the Boundary: -I’ll Be Here- Future (2015)
 KanColle: The Movie (2016)
 Sound! Euphonium: The Movie - Welcome to the Kitauji High School Marching Band (2016)
 No Game No Life: Zero (2017)
 Sound! Euphonium: Todoketai Melody (2017)
 Love, Chunibyo %26 Other Delusions! Take on Me (2018)
 Love Live! Sunshine!! The School Idol Movie: Over The Rainbow (2019)
 Sound! Euphonium: The Movie - Our Promise: A Brand New Day (2019)

Books

Light novels
Ojōsama Express (1996–97)
Kururi kuru!: De suru Raishū (2001)
Dai Kiraina, ano Sora ni (2001)
Second Stage (2001)
Twice X'mas (2001)

Manga
Kururi kuru! (2001, Comic Gum) – Story
Hōrorogion (2009, Dengeki Daioh) – Story

References

External links

1969 births
Living people
Anime screenwriters
Manga writers
Light novelists